Marshwood High School is a public high school in York County, Maine, United States. It serves the towns of Eliot and South Berwick, as well as Rollinsford, New Hampshire. It has been at its current location at 260 Dow Highway (Route 236) in South Berwick since September 1999, when it was moved from its previous location in Eliot.

The school's mascot is the Hawk.

The school offers a variety of varsity athletics.

History

In 1966, the towns of Eliot and South Berwick joined to form MSAD #35, and a new high school was built on Depot Road in Eliot. The high school was relocated to Route 236 in South Berwick in 2000.

Notable alumni
 Jonathan Courtney, State Senator
 Deanna Rix, wrestler

References

External links

Public high schools in Maine
Schools in York County, Maine
Eliot, Maine
South Berwick, Maine